Clyde River (Syllabics: ᑲᖏᖅᑐᒑᐱᒃ, Inuktitut: Kanngiqtugaapik "nice little inlet") is an Inuit hamlet located on the shore of Baffin Island's Patricia Bay, off Kangiqtugaapik, an arm of Davis Strait in the Qikiqtaaluk Region, of Nunavut, Canada. It lies in the Baffin Mountains which in turn form part of the Arctic Cordillera mountain range. The community is served by air and by annual supply sealift.

The community is served by Quluaq School, the Northern Stores, an arena, a community hall, an Anglican church (the Church of the Redeemer), a health centre, hotel and Clyde River Airport with regular flights to Iqaluit and Pond Inlet.

Geography 
It is located on a flood plain, surrounded by spectacular fjords that stretch all the way into the Barnes Ice Cap. The mountains, icebergs and glaciers in the Clyde River area attract rock and ice climbers from around the world.

There is also a multitude of animals to be seen, including barren-ground caribou, narwhals, polar bears and other sea mammals. The proposed "Igaliqtuuq National Wildlife Area", which would be a protected bowhead whale sanctuary, is located in Isabella Bay.

Clyde River is home to Piqqusilirivvik, Nunavut's Inuit Cultural Learning Centre. Piqqusilirivvik opened its doors May 2011.

Demographics 

Supreme Court case
On June 26, 2014, the National Energy Board (NEB) approved the 5-year plan to conduct seismic blasting off the coast of Baffin Island, jointly submitted by TGS-NOPEC Geophysical Company ASA (TGS), Petroleum Geo-Services (PGS) and Multi Klient Invest AS (MKI). The approval sparked strong criticism from Inuit including the communities of Clyde River and Pond Inlet, the Arctic Fishery Alliance, the Baffin Fisheries Coalition and the Qikiqtani Inuit Association. Okalik Eegeesiak, then-president of the Qikiqtani Inuit Association said "They still don't get the fact that Inuit have concerns and we want to be part of the process," while Inuit photographer and Clyde River resident Niore Iqalukjuak was quoted saying "We depend on these waters for food and the very existence of Inuit life depend on them...We fear that what the Conservative government is doing is a cultural genocide and will end the Inuit way of life as we know it" and Clyde River Mayor, Jerry Natanine commented "Nobody cares for our concerns...And our Minister [of the Environment] in Ottawa, Leona Aglukkaq, not speaking up against this for Inuit is very wrong."

Mayor Natanine approached the environmental organization Greenpeace Canada in hopes that they could work together to prevent seismic blasting operations from taking place. This led to the development of a collaboration many dubbed "surprising" due to the history of taking opposing sides on the anti-sealing campaign of the 1970s and 80s.

On July 23, 2014, the community of Clyde River staged a protest against the NEB's approval, and on July 28 the Hamlet of Clyde River, the Nammautaq Hunters and Trappers Organization of Clyde River, and Clyde River Mayor Jerry Natanine filed a request for a judicial review at Federal Court of Appeal. The legal case argues that the NEB's decision goes against the government of Canada's duty to consult with Indigenous peoples under the United Nations Declaration on the Rights of Indigenous Peoples. Speaking of the importance of the case, constitutional lawyer Nader Hasan, who is representing Clyde River, argued: "The federal government has a solemn constitutional obligation to meaningfully consult and accommodate the people of Nunavut on any issues affecting their Aboriginal or treaty rights. That did not happen, and the NEB was again a rubber stamp for the energy industry."

The Court of Appeal denied the request in August 2015. But the groups requested leave to appeal before the Supreme Court of Canada in October 2015, arguing that the Court of Appeal's decision was mistaken, and that the case is of national importance, thus needing further debate. In November of the same year Greenpeace launched an international petition that has gathered over 129,000 signatures (as of July 2016) in support of this legal challenge.

On March 10, 2016, the Supreme Court of Canada granted Clyde River leave to appeal their case at the country's highest court, giving credence to the community's claim that their case is significant, thus needing further review by the courts. The hearing of the case was scheduled for November 20, 2016.

In July 2017, the Supreme Court ruled in Clyde River's favour, ruling that oil and gas exploration cannot go ahead.

Broadband communications 
The community has been served by the Qiniq network since 2005. Qiniq is a fixed wireless service to homes and businesses, connecting to the outside world via a satellite backbone. The Qiniq network is designed and operated by SSI Micro. In 2017, the network was upgraded to 4G LTE technology, and 2G-GSM for mobile voice.

Climate
Clyde River has a tundra climate (ET) with short but cool summers and long cold winters.

Gallery

See also
List of municipalities in Nunavut
 Pauloosie Paniloo
 Tommy Enuaraq

References

Further reading

 Gearheard S, W Matumeak, I Angutikjuaq, J Maslanik, HP Huntington, J Leavitt, DM Kagak, G Tigullaraq, and RG Barry. 2006. ""It's Not That Simple": A Collaborative Comparison of Sea Ice Environments, Their Uses, Observed Changes, and Adaptations in Barrow, Alaska, USA, and Clyde River, Nunavut, Canada". Ambio. 35, no. 4: 203-11.
 Igutaq Group Clyde River. Igutaq Group Clyde River Prints/Estampes, 1981. Ottawa: Igutaq Group, 1981. 
 Nickels, Scot. Northern Conservation and Tourism The Perceptions of Clyde River Inuit. Ottawa: National Library of Canada, 1992. 
 Sekerak, A. D. A Community Plan to Increase Fish Populations Near Clyde River, N.W.T. [Yellowknife, N.W.T.]: The Dept, 1991.

External links

 Clyde River at the Government of Nunavut - PDF

Populated places in Baffin Island
Arctic Cordillera
Populated places in Arctic Canada
Hudson's Bay Company trading posts in Nunavut
Hamlets in the Qikiqtaaluk Region
Road-inaccessible communities of Nunavut